Manfred (Moses) Stern (also known as Emilio Kléber, Lazar Stern, Moishe Stern, Mark Zilbert) (1896–1954) was a member of the GRU, Soviet military intelligence. He served as a spy in the United States, as a military advisor in China, and gained fame under his nom de guerre as General Kléber, leader of the International Brigade during the Spanish Civil War.

Early life 
He was born into a Jewish family in northern Moldova (now Chernivtsi Raion, Chernivtsi Oblast, Ukraine), a province of the Austro-Hungarian Empire on the border between Romania and Ukraine. He studied medicine at the University of Vienna.

World War I and the Russian Revolution 
Drafted into the Austro-Hungarian army at the beginning of World War I, he was captured by the Tsarist army and taken to a prisoner of war camp in Siberia. Freed by the October Revolution, he became a Bolshevik and joined the Red Army. He led a partisan unit in Siberia against the White Army of Admiral Kolchak and fought in Mongolia against the  warlord "bloody" Baron Ungern von Sternberg and his ally, the religious leader Bogd Khan. In 1921 he was elected to the Constituent Assembly of the short-lived Far Eastern Republic.

After the Civil War, he returned to Moscow and enrolled in the Frunze Military Academy. Upon graduation, in 1924, he joined Walter Krivitsky in the Red Army's Fourth Department (the GRU, or military intelligence). He was assigned to the Comintern and acted as an instructor in its military schools.

Espionage career 
In 1929, Stern became the GRU's chief spy in the United States. Based in New York City and operating under the cover name of Mark Zilbert, he managed a network of sources and agents involved in the theft of military secrets. In one operation they stole the plans for a new American tank. Another operation was foiled by a source who went to U.S. Naval Intelligence and continued to deliver faked documents to the Soviets.

The apparatus kept a safe apartment on West 57th Street, owned by Paula Levine, later part of a Soviet spy ring in Paris, and kept a photographic studio on Gay Street in Greenwich Village.  There "Charlie," in actuality Leon Minster, GRU operator of a front, the Ellem Radio Equipment Shop, microfilmed the stolen documents. German sailors acted as couriers to the GRU in Europe. (These details come from Witness, the 1952 memoir of Whittaker Chambers.)

Military advisor in China 
After handing off to Alexander Ulanovsky in New York, Stern traveled in 1932 to Shanghai where he served as the Comintern's military advisor to the newly created Jiangxi Soviet. Stern's activities in China remain veiled in mystery. In a report to the Moscow Comintern, he claimed that he tried to forge an alliance between the Chinese Red Army and a rebel Nationalist army whose officers had seized control of nearby Fukien province. However, this alliance failed and the National Revolutionary Army, under the command of Chiang Kai-shek, encircled the Chinese Red Army, forcing them to abandon their base in Jiangxi and to begin the Long March.

Stern returned to Moscow in 1935 and worked briefly for Otto Kuusinen in the secretariat of the Executive Committee of the Comintern (ECCI).

"General Kléber" and the Spanish Civil War 
Stern arrived in Spain on a hot day in September 1936, disguised inappropriately as a "furrier." He adopted the name of one of Napoleon's generals, Jean-Baptiste Kléber, and posed as an Austrian-born Canadian citizen. He served as a military advisor to the International Brigades against Franco's rebel army.

During the Battle of Madrid in November 1936, he led the 3,000 member XI International Brigade. At a time when it appeared all was lost —the Republican government of Largo Caballero had already abandoned the capital— the arrival of Kléber and the International Brigade boosted the morale of Madrid's Republican defenders when the loyalist troops fought from street to street and held the line at Casa de Campo, repulsing the Nationalists. Soviet propaganda broadcast the 'Victory over Fascism' throughout the world and —despite General Miaja's and General Vicente Rojo's crucial role— heralded General Kléber as the "Savior of Madrid". The New York Times correspondent Herbert Matthews interviewed Stern shortly after the battle. "Listening to General Kléber," he wrote, "one gets the impression of great dynamic force. He is a character possibly destined to play a great part in the troubled years which face the world... In thinking about him it is hard not to ponder on the ironical fact that Hitler is not the only native of Austria who is playing a great part in the Spanish Civil War."

In 1937 he led the newly established 45th Division, but a leadership dispute caused Kléber to be replaced by Hans Kahle as leader of the Republican Infantry division. Even so, Stern remained in Spain as liaison agent with the Republican Government and still enjoyed military prestige among Spanish Communist Party members. He left Spain when the International Brigades were withdrawn in October 1938.

Recall to Moscow, imprisonment, and death 
The NKVD chief in Spain, Alexander Orlov, knew that Stern's recall meant certain imprisonment and death because in Moscow Joseph Stalin and Nikolai Yezhov were busy purging the Red Army. He offered to employ Stern as a member of the NKVD. While awaiting orders, Stern spent his final months in Spain relaxing at a small orange plantation and entertaining his young Spanish mistress. Kliment Voroshilov denied his transfer and ordered his return to Moscow.

In May 1939 a Military Collegium condemned Stern to fifteen years of hard labor. He became a nonperson. His name was deliberately withheld from official Soviet histories of the Spanish Civil War. The remaining years of his life were spent in the Gulag and he  died of exhaustion at a labor camp in Sosnovka on February 18, 1954.

See also 
 Otto Braun (communist)

References

Sources 

1896 births
1954 deaths
People from Chernivtsi Oblast
Ukrainian Jews
Soviet spies against the United States
Soviet Jews in the military
German people of the Spanish Civil War
Soviet generals
Soviet people of the Spanish Civil War
GRU officers
Jewish Chinese history
Jewish socialists
Soviet people who died in prison custody
International Brigades personnel
Austrian emigrants to the Soviet Union
Frunze Military Academy alumni